The 1964 British Grand Prix was a Formula One motor race held at Brands Hatch on 11 July 1964. The event was also designated as the European Grand Prix. It was race 5 of 10 in both the 1964 World Championship of Drivers and the 1964 International Cup for Formula One Manufacturers. The first of twelve British Grands Prix to be held at the southern England circuit, it would alternate with Silverstone until 1987. The race was won by Jim Clark driving a Lotus 25.

Classification

Qualifying

Race

Championship standings after the race 

Drivers' Championship standings

Constructors' Championship standings

 Notes: Only the top five positions are included for both sets of standings.

References

External links 
 1964 British Grand Prix at statsf1.com
 1964 British Grand Prix at grandprix.com

British Grand Prix
British Grand Prix
Grand Prix
European Grand Prix